Unicode contains a number of characters that represent various cultural, political, and religious symbols.  
Most, but not all, of these symbols are in the Miscellaneous Symbols block.

The majority of them are treated as graphic symbols that are not characters.

Exceptions to this include characters in certain writing systems that are also in use as political or religious symbols, such as 卐 (U+5350), the swastika encoded as a Chinese character (although it is also encoded as a religious symbol at U+0FD5);
or ॐ (U+0950), the Om symbol which is, strictly speaking, a Devanagari ligature. 
A special case is ﷲ (U+FDF2), which is a special ligature of Arabic script used only for writing of the word Allah.  This ligature is in the Arabic Presentation Forms-A block, which was only encoded for compatibility and is not recommended for use in regular Arabic text.

Unicode defines the semantics of a character by its character identity and its normative properties, one of these being the character's general category, given as a two-letter code (e.g. Lu for "uppercase letter"). 
Characters that fall in the "political or religious" category are given the "general category" So, which is the catch-all category for "Symbol, other", i.e. anything considered a "symbol" which does not fall in any of the three other categories of 
Sm (mathematical symbols), Sc (currency symbols) or Sk (phonetic modifier symbols, i.e. IPA signs not considered letters).

Armenian block
The Unicode chart for the Armenian block notes two religious symbols:
{| class="wikitable" style="text-align:center"
|-
! Symbol !! Code point !! Name
|-
|  || U+058D || style="text-align:left" | RIGHT-FACING ARMENIAN ETERNITY SIGN
|-
|  || U+058E || style="text-align:left" | LEFT-FACING ARMENIAN ETERNITY SIGN
|}

Dingbats block
The Dingbats block also contains some symbols with political/religious connotations:
{| class="wikitable" style="text-align:center"
|-
! Symbol !! Code point !! Name
|-
|  || U+2719 || style="text-align:left" | OUTLINED GREEK CROSS
|-
|  || U+271A || style="text-align:left" | HEAVY GREEK CROSS
|-
|  || U+271B || style="text-align:left" | OPEN CENTER CROSS
|-
|  || U+271C || style="text-align:left" | HEAVY OPEN CENTER CROSS
|-
|  || U+271D || style="text-align:left" | LATIN CROSS
|-
|  || U+271E || style="text-align:left" | SHADOWED WHITE LATIN CROSS
|-
|  || U+271F || style="text-align:left" | OUTLINED LATIN CROSS
|-
|  || U+2720 || style="text-align:left" | MALTESE CROSS
|-
|  || U+2721 || style="text-align:left" | STAR OF DAVID
|}

Geometric Shapes Extended
Other weights of the Greek cross are in Geometric Shapes Extended.

{| class="wikitable" style="text-align:center"
|-
! Symbol !! Code point !! Name
|-
|  || U+1F7A1 || style="text-align:left" | THIN GREEK CROSS
|-
|  || U+1F7A2 || style="text-align:left" | LIGHT GREEK CROSS
|-
|  || U+1F7A3 || style="text-align:left" | MEDIUM GREEK CROSS
|-
|  || U+1F7A4 || style="text-align:left" | BOLD GREEK CROSS
|-
|  || U+1F7A5 || style="text-align:left" | VERY BOLD GREEK CROSS
|-
|  || U+1F7A6 || style="text-align:left" | VERY HEAVY GREEK CROSS
|-
|  || U+1F7A7 || style="text-align:left" | EXTREMELY HEAVY GREEK CROSS
|-
|  || U+1F7D9 || style="text-align:left" | NINE POINTED WHITE STAR (Baháʼí symbol)
|}

Enclosed Ideographic Supplement block
The Unicode chart for the Enclosed Ideographic Supplement block notes several symbols used for Chinese folk religion:
{| class="wikitable" style="text-align:center"
|-
! Symbol !! Code point !! Name and notes
|-
|  || U+1F260 || style="text-align:left" | ROUNDED SYMBOL FOR FU (luck)
|-
|  || U+1F261 || style="text-align:left" | ROUNDED SYMBOL FOR LU (prosperity)
|-
|  || U+1F262 || style="text-align:left" | ROUNDED SYMBOL FOR SHOU (longevity)
|-
|  || U+1F263 || style="text-align:left" | ROUNDED SYMBOL FOR XI (happiness)
|-
|  || U+1F264 || style="text-align:left" | ROUNDED SYMBOL FOR SHUANGXI (double happiness, love and marriage)
|-
|  || U+1F265 || style="text-align:left" | ROUNDED SYMBOL FOR CAI (wealth)
|}

Miscellaneous Symbols block
The Unicode chart for the Miscellaneous Symbols block has a section explicitly labelled "Religious and political symbols":
{| class="wikitable" style="text-align:center"
|-
! Text !! Emoji !! Code point !! Name and notes
|-
|  ||  || U+2626 || style="text-align:left" | ORTHODOX CROSS
|-
|  || || U+2627 || style="text-align:left" | CHI RHO = Constantine's cross, Christogram → 2CE9    coptic symbol khi ro
|-
|  || || U+2628 || style="text-align:left" | CROSS OF LORRAINE
|-
|  || || U+2629 || style="text-align:left" | CROSS OF JERUSALEM → 1F70A   alchemical symbol for vinegar
|-
|  ||  || U+262A || style="text-align:left" | STAR AND CRESCENT
|-
|  || || U+262B || style="text-align:left" | FARSI SYMBOL = symbol of Iran (1.0)
|-
|  || 🪯|| U+262C || style="text-align:left" | ADI SHAKTI = Gurmukhi khanda - ਖੰਡਾ
|-
|  || || U+262D || style="text-align:left" | HAMMER AND SICKLE
|-
|  ||  || U+262E || style="text-align:left" | PEACE SYMBOL
|-
|  ||  || U+262F || style="text-align:left" | YIN YANG → 0FCA    Tibetan symbol nor bu nyis -khyil
|-
|  || || U+26E7 || style="text-align:left" | INVERTED PENTAGRAM
|}
Elsewhere in the block is:
{| class="wikitable" style="text-align:center"
|-
! Text !! Emoji !! Code point !! Name and notes
|-
|  || || U+2670 || style="text-align:left" | WEST SYRIAC CROSS
|-
|  || || U+2671 || style="text-align:left" | EAST SYRIAC CROSS
|-
|  ||  || U+26E9 || style="text-align:left" | SHINTO SHRINE
|}

The emoji variants have U+FE0F after the symbol.

Miscellaneous Symbols and Pictographs block
The Unicode chart for the Miscellaneous Symbols and Pictographs block notes many religious symbols:
{| class="wikitable" style="text-align:center"
! Text !! Emoji !! Code point !! Name and notes
|-
|  ||  || U+1F4FF || style="text-align:left" | PRAYER BEADS
|-
|  || || U+1F540 || style="text-align:left" | CIRCLED CROSS POMMEE (Orthodox typicon symbol for great feast service)
|-
|  || || U+1F541 || style="text-align:left" | CROSS POMMEE WITH HALF-CIRCLE BELOW (Orthodox typicon symbol for vigil service)
|-
|  || || U+1F542 || style="text-align:left" | CROSS POMMEE (Orthodox typicon symbol for Polyeleos)
|-
|  || || U+1F543 || style="text-align:left" | NOTCHED LEFT SEMICIRCLE WITH THREE DOTS (Orthodox typicon symbol for lower rank feast)
|-
|  || || U+1F544 || style="text-align:left" | NOTCHED RIGHT SEMICIRCLE WITH THREE DOTS (Orthodox typicon symbol for lower rank feast)
|-
|  || || U+1F545 || style="text-align:left" | SYMBOL FOR MARKS CHAPTER (Orthodox typicon symbol for difficult sections)
|-
|  || || U+1F546 || style="text-align:left" | WHITE LATIN CROSS = cross outline
|-
|  || || U+1F547 || style="text-align:left" | HEAVY LATIN CROSS
|-
|  || || U+1F548 || style="text-align:left" | CELTIC CROSS
|-
|  ||  || U+1F549 || style="text-align:left" | OM SYMBOL (generic symbol independent of Devanagari letter )
|-
|  ||  || U+1F54A || style="text-align:left" | DOVE OF PEACE = peace
|-
|  ||  || U+1F54B || style="text-align:left" | KAABA
|-
|  ||  || U+1F54C || style="text-align:left" | MOSQUE
|-
|  ||  || U+1F54D || style="text-align:left" | SYNAGOGUE
|-
|  ||  || U+1F54E || style="text-align:left" | MENORAH WITH NINE BRANCHES = hanukiah
|}

Ostensibly religious symbols are, however, not limited to this section, as the same chart has another short section of two characters labelled "Syriac cross symbols", with the explanatory gloss "These symbols are used in liturgical texts of Syriac-speaking churches".
Another short section of two symbols is headed "Medical and healing symbols", including U+2624 ☤ Caduceus (c.f. U+1F750 🝐 "alchemical symbol for caduceus"), U+2695 ⚕ Staff of Aesculapius, and U+2625 ☥ Ankh, all of which originate in  polytheistic religious traditions.

Symbols and Pictographs Extended-A block
The Unicode chart for the Symbols and Pictographs Extended-A block notes one religious symbol":
{| class="wikitable" style="text-align:center"
|-
! Text !! Emoji !! Code point !! Name and notes
|-
|  ||  || U+1FAAF || style="text-align:left" | KHANDA
|}

Tibetan block
The Unicode chart for the Tibetan block notes several religious symbols:
{| class="wikitable" style="text-align:center"
|-
! Symbol !! Code point !! Name and notes
|-
|  || U+0FD5 || style="text-align:left" | RIGHT-FACING SVASTI SIGN = gyung drung nang -khor (symbol of good luck and well-being in India)
|-
|  || U+0FD6 || style="text-align:left" | LEFT-FACING SVASTI SIGN = gyung drung phyi -khor
|-
|  || U+0FD7 || style="text-align:left" | RIGHT-FACING SVASTI SIGN WITH DOTS = gyung drung nang -khor bzhi mig can
|-
|  || U+0FD8 || style="text-align:left" | LEFT-FACING SVASTI SIGN WITH DOTS = gyung drung phyi -khor bzhi mig can
|}

Soyombo block
The Soyombo symbol is a special character in the Soyombo alphabet devised for the Mongolian language.
It appears in several flags of Mongolia.
Three forms appear in the Soyombo block.

See also
National flags are implemented by Regional indicator symbols in the Enclosed Alphanumeric Supplement block.

References

Unicode
Unicode
Unicode